Calumet Hotel may refer to:

Calumet Hotel (Pipestone, Minnesota), listed on the NRHP in Minnesota
Calumet Hotel (Portland, Oregon), listed on the NRHP in Oregon
Calumet Hotel (Wasta, South Dakota), listed on the NRHP in South Dakota